The 2010 New Zealand Derby was a horse race which took place at Ellerslie Racecourse on Saturday 6 March 2010. It was the 135th running of the New Zealand Derby, and it was won by Military Move.

The race was one of the most highly anticipated runnings of the New Zealand Derby in years, with a dual Group 1-winning colt seeking to win the VRC Derby-New Zealand Derby double and two high-class fillies entered to take on the males in an attempt to secure a rare win for a filly in New Zealand's most prestigious three-year-old race.

The favourite was Zarzuela, a daughter of Zabeel who in an impressive Derby campaign won the Great Northern Guineas, Waikato Guineas and Championship Stakes.

The other top filly in the race was Katie Lee, a winner of six stakes races who in November made history by becoming the first horse to win both the New Zealand 2000 Guineas and New Zealand 1000 Guineas. Many doubted her ability to stay the 2400m of the race and perhaps that factor, combined with a gruelling 10-race campaign exclusively at stakes level and the slightly shifty track conditions of the Derby, was her undoing.

Of the male horses, the most talked about was VRC Derby winner, Monaco Consul. The son of High Chaparral was seeking to become the first horse ever to win the VRC-New Zealand Derby double. He extinguished his own chances by running out badly at the last turn.

The other highly fancied runner was Corporal Jones, who in five career starts had never finished further back than second. After a memorable two-horse battle down the straight in the Championship Stakes between Corporal Jones and Zarzuela, many predicted a repeat in the Derby and that the same two horses would have the race to themselves.

But in the excitement of the head-bobbing finish between those two horses in the Championship Stakes, many overlooked the strong run from well back in the field by New Zealand 2000 Guineas runner-up Military Move, who went out on Derby day at 15–1.

It was Military Move who took the honours, though, handling the 2400m of the Derby brilliantly and aided by a perfect ride from Michael Walker. Walker, who in May 2008 was nearly killed when he fell 10m down a bank while on a pig hunting trip, celebrated the win in a memorable and emotional manner. It was his first Group 1 win since his accident, and a race he later said he had always dreamt of winning.

Race details
 Sponsor: Telecom
 Prize money: NZ$2.2 million
 Track: Good
 Number of runners: 15
 Winner's time: 2:27.91

Full result

Winner's details
Further details of the winner, Military Move:

 Foaled: 7 October 2006 in New Zealand
 Sire: Volksraad; Dam: All Night Party (Just A Dancer)
 Owner: Steven Lo
 Trainer: Shaune Ritchie
 Breeder: Windsor Park Stud
 Starts: 8
 Wins: 2
 Seconds: 2
 Thirds: 1
 Earnings: $1,502,775

The road to the Derby
Early-season appearances in 2009-10 prior to running in the Derby.

 Military Move – 2nd Bonecrusher Stakes, 3rd Wellington Guineas, 2nd New Zealand 2000 Guineas, 5th Wellington Stakes, 4th Waikato Guineas, 5th Championship Stakes
 Corporal Jones – 2nd Waikato Guineas, 2nd Championship Stakes
 Handsome Zulu – 2nd Wellington Stakes
 Zarzuela – 8th Levin Classic, 1st Great Northern Guineas, 1st Waikato Guineas, 1st Championship Stakes
 Time Keeper – 3rd Great Northern Guineas, 3rd Karaka Mile, 4th Championship Stakes
 Martial Art – 3rd Karaka Mile, 7th Championship Stakes
 Jungle Juice – 3rd Waikato Guineas, 13th Championship Stakes
 Imabayboy – 5th Waikato Guineas
 Smokin' Gun – 13th Waikato Guineas
 Katie Lee – 3rd Gold Trail Stakes, 1st James & Annie Sarten Memorial Stakes, 1st New Zealand 2000 Guineas, 1st New Zealand 1000 Guineas, 2nd Eulogy Stakes, 1st Eight Carat Classic, 2nd Royal Stakes, 3rd Desert Gold Stakes, 1st Sir Tristram Fillies Classic
 King Raedwald – 4th Levin Classic, 3rd Championship Stakes

Subsequent Group 1 wins

Subsequent wins at Group 1 level by runners in the 2010 New Zealand Derby.

 Time Keeper - 2010 Easter Handicap

See also

 2019 New Zealand Derby
 2018 New Zealand Derby
 2017 New Zealand Derby
 2016 New Zealand Derby
 2015 New Zealand Derby
 2014 New Zealand Derby
 2013 New Zealand Derby
 2012 New Zealand Derby
 2011 New Zealand Derby
  Recent winners of major NZ 3 year old races
 Desert Gold Stakes
 Hawke's Bay Guineas
 Karaka Million
 Levin Classic
 New Zealand 1000 Guineas
 New Zealand 2000 Guineas
 New Zealand Oaks

References

External links
 2010 New Zealand Derby replay - YouTube

New Zealand Derby
2010 in New Zealand sport
New Zealand Derby
March 2010 sports events in New Zealand